Valentino Lando Lazaro (born 24 March 1996) is an Austrian professional footballer who plays as a right midfielder and full-back for  club Torino, on loan from Inter Milan. He also plays for the Austria national team.

Club career
Lazaro was born in Graz, Austria, to an Angolan father and a  Greek Cypriot mother. He made his full debut for Red Bull Salzburg on 3 November 2012 against Admira Wacker in the league. At 16 years and 224 days, he became the youngest player ever in the history of the Austrian Bundesliga.

Lazaro's loan deal from Red Bull Salzburg to Hertha BSC was made permanent in 2017, when he was signed on a long term deal at the Bundesliga club. He scored his first goal for Hertha BSC in a 2–0 away win against Bayer Leverkusen on 10 February 2018.

Inter Milan
On 1 July 2019, Lazaro joined Inter Milan. He made his Serie A debut in Inter's 4–3 defeat of Sassuolo on 20 October 2019.

Loan to Newcastle United
On 24 January 2020, Lazaro joined Newcastle United on loan for the remainder of the 2019–20 season and was handed the number 23 shirt. He scored his first Newcastle goal in a 3–2 win over West Bromwich Albion to secure a spot in the quarter-finals of the FA Cup.  On 1 July, Lazaro scored his first goal in the Premier League for the club in a 4–1 win over  Bournemouth.

Loan to Borussia Mönchengladbach
After the end of the loan spell at Newcastle, on 20 August 2020, Lazaro joined Borussia Mönchengladbach on a season-long loan. On 8 November 2020, he scored his first goal with a scorpion kick in a 3–4 defeat against Bayer Leverkusen. The goal would be awarded as both the goal of the month for November and the Bundesliga goal of the season.

Loan to Torino
On 1 August 2022, Lazaro moved on loan to Torino, with an option to buy.

International career
Lazaro made his senior debut for the Austria national team 30 May 2014 in a 1–1 friendly draw against Iceland in Innsbruck, replacing Marko Arnautović for the last fifteen minutes.

Career statistics

Club

International

Scores and results list Austria's goal tally first, score column indicates score after each Lazaro goal.

Honours
Red Bull Salzburg
Austrian Bundesliga: 2011–12, 2013–14, 2014–15, 2015–16, 2016–17
Austrian Cup: 2011–12, 2013–14, 2014–15, 2015–16, 2016–17
Individual
 Bundesliga Goal of the Month: November 2020
 Bundesliga Goal of the Year: 2020–21

References

External links

Eurosport profile

1996 births
Living people
Footballers from Graz
Austrian footballers
Austria youth international footballers
Austria under-21 international footballers
Austria international footballers
Austrian people of Angolan descent
Austrian people of Greek descent
People of Greek Cypriot descent
Association football midfielders
FC Red Bull Salzburg players
FC Liefering players
Hertha BSC players
Hertha BSC II players
Inter Milan players
Newcastle United F.C. players
Borussia Mönchengladbach players
S.L. Benfica footballers
Torino F.C. players
Austrian Football Bundesliga players
2. Liga (Austria) players
Bundesliga players
Regionalliga players
Serie A players
Premier League players
Primeira Liga players
UEFA Euro 2020 players
Austrian expatriate footballers
Austrian expatriate sportspeople in Germany
Expatriate footballers in Germany
Austrian expatriate sportspeople in Italy
Expatriate footballers in Italy
Austrian expatriate sportspeople in England
Expatriate footballers in England
Expatriate footballers in Portugal